Joseph Naḥmias (also Joseph ibn Joseph ibn Naḥmias) was a 14th-century Jewish scholar of Toledo, Castile, a student of Asher ben Jehiel. He is best known for an astronomical work in Arabic, Nūr al-ʿĀlam ("The Light of the World") between c. 1330 and 1350, translated into Hebrew by an anonymous scholar later in the 14th century. Naḥmias is also the author of commentaries on the Pentateuch, on Pirkei Avot and on Proverbs.

Joseph b. Abraham ibn Naḥmias was the name of a contemporary of Joseph ben Joseph ibn Naḥmias, who also lived at Toledo, was a colleague of Judah and Jacob ben Asher, and wrote a commentary on Esther in 1326 or 1327.

References

Robert G. Morrison, "The Solar Model in Joseph Ibn Joseph Ibn Nahmias' 'Light of the World'", Arabic Sciences and Philosophy  15 (2005), 57–108.
Robert G. Morrison (ed. and trans.), The Light of the World: Astronomy in al-Andalus, University of California Press (2016).
J. S. Raisin, Meyer Kayserling, Isidore Singer, Joseph Jacobs, NAḤMIAS (NAAMIAS, NEHMIAS) in Jewish Encyclopedia, vol. 9 (1905), p. 145.

14th-century astronomers
14th-century Castilian Jews
Medieval Jewish scholars
14th-century deaths
Year of birth unknown

Medieval Jewish astronomers
Medieval Spanish astronomers
Judeo-Arabic writers